HMS Retalick (K555) was a British Captain-class frigate of the Royal Navy in commission during World War II. Originally constructed as a United States Navy Buckley class destroyer escort, she served in the Royal Navy from 1943 to 1945.

Construction and transfer
The ship was laid down as the unnamed U.S. Navy destroyer escort DE-90 by Bethlehem-Hingham Shipyard, Inc., in Hingham, Massachusetts, on 21 July 1943 and launched on 9 October 1943. She was transferred to the United Kingdom under Lend-Lease upon completion on 8 December 1943.

Service history

Commissioned into service in the Royal Navy as the frigate HMS Retalick (K555) on 8 December 1943 simultaneously with her transfer, the ship served on patrol and escort duty for the remainder of World War II.

The Royal Navy returned Retalick to the U.S. Navy on 25 October 1945.

Disposal
The U.S. Navy struck Retalick from its Naval Vessel Register on 19 December 1945. She was sold on 7 May 1946 for scrapping.

References
Sources
Navsource Online: Destroyer Escort Photo Archive Retalick (DE-90) HMS Retalick (K-555)
uboat.net HMS Retalick (K 555)
Destroyer Escort Sailors Association DEs for UK
Captain Class Frigate Association HMS Retalick K555 (DE 90)
Citations

External links
Photo gallery of HMS Retalick (K555)

 

Buckley-class destroyer escorts
Captain-class frigates
Naval ships of Operation Neptune
Ships built in Hingham, Massachusetts
World War II frigates of the United Kingdom
1943 ships